Usman Mamman Durkwa is a Nigerian politician who served as the deputy governor of Borno state from 2015 to 2019.

References 

Nigerian politicians
Living people
People from Borno State
Year of birth missing (living people)